Tommy Ford may refer to:

 Thomas Mikal Ford (1964–2016), American actor also credited as Tommy Ford
 Tommy Ford (skier) (born 1989), American alpine ski racer 
 Tommy Ford (Canadian football) (born c. 1927), Canadian footballer
 Tommy Ford (American football), American football player
 Tommy A. Ford (1919–2000), American actor also credited as Tommy A. Ford, born Tommaso Fasulo
Played "Lubin" in Q & A (1990)

See also
 Thomas Ford (disambiguation)